Swami and Friends is the first of a series of novels written by R. K. Narayan (1906–2001), English language novelist from India. The novel, the first book Narayan wrote, is set in British India in a fictional town called Malgudi. The second and third books in the trilogy are The Bachelor of Arts and The English Teacher.

The novel follows a ten-year-old schoolboy, Swaminathan, and his attempts to court the favour of a much wealthier schoolboy, Rajam. 

Malgudi Schooldays is a slightly abridged version of Swami and Friends, and includes two additional stories featuring Swami from Malgudi Days and Under the Banyan Tree.

Summary 
Swaminathan is a lazy schoolboy who lives with his father, mother, and grandmother in Malgudi. He attends the Albert Mission School with his friends Samuel, Sankar, Somu, and Mani. The arrival of a new student, Rajam -- the son of a wealthy police superintendent -- threatens Swami's popularity. After an initial rivalry, Swami and Rajam reconcile and become friends. 

A protest, part of Gandhi's non-cooperative movement, erupts through the town. Swami, participating in the protests, breaks the window of the headmaster's room. Rajam's father leads a violent crackdown of the protest. The next day, a distressed Swami runs away from the school after the headmaster vows to punish participating students. He is subsequently expelled from Albert Mission and is compelled to enroll in the stricter and more rigorous Board High School. 

Rajam and Swami start a cricket club, gathering friends together for practice after school, in which Swami is chronically tardy due to his relatively late-afternoon dismissal from Board High School. With a match scheduled, Swami pleads with his new headmaster to allow him to leave class early; he refuses. An undeterred Swami is caught committing truancy after asking a doctor to write a note of absence and is beaten and expelled by the headmaster. 

Now expelled from two schools, and fearing his father's wrath at home, Swami runs away from town. Becoming lost and hungry, Swami regrets his decision. Meanwhile, Swami's father attempts to locate his missing son. Swami is discovered by a man carrying a cart who promptly contacts his parents. Swami's relief at returning home turns to dismay when his friends report that they have lost their cricket game, and Rajam declares the end of their friendship. 

One night, Mani informs Swami that Rajam and his family are relocating to another city. Swami wakes up early the next day to attempt to reconcile and bid his farewell to Rajam, gifting him a copy of Hans Christen Anderson's Fairy Tales. He asks Rajam, as the train speeds away, if he would ever return, but his reply is drowned out by the sound of the locomotive. Swami weeps, wondering if Rajam would ever think of him again.

Publication 
Swami and Friends is the first novel written by Sir R. K Narayan. It was published through the intervention of a friend and neighbour ("Kittu" Purna) who was studying at Oxford. Through him, Graham Greene came into contact with Narayan's work, became especially interested in it and took it upon himself to place the book with a reputable English publisher (Hamish Hamilton). Graham Greene was responsible for the title Swami and Friends, changing it from Narayan's Swami, the Tate, suggesting that it would have the advantage of having some resemblance to Rudyard Kipling's Stalky & Co..

Greene arranged the details of the contract and remained closely involved until the novel was published. Narayan's indebtedness to Greene is inscribed on the front endpaper of a copy of Swami and Friends Narayan presented to Greene: "But for you, Swami should be in the bottom of Thames now".

Characters

Albert Mission School friends 
 W.S. Swaminathan: A ten-year-old boy studying at Albert Mission School, Malgudi. He lives in Vinayaka Mudali Street. He is later transferred to Board High School.
 Mani: Swami's classmate at Albert Mission School, lives in Abu Lane, he is known as 'Mighty good-for-nothing'. He carries around a club sometimes, and threatens to beat his enemies to a pulp. He is hardly concerned about his studies.
 M. Rajam: Swami's classmate at Albert Mission School, lives in Lawley Extension. His father is the Deputy Police Superintendent of Malgudi. He previously studied at an English Boys' School, Madras. He is also the Captain of Malgudi Cricket Club (MCC).
 Somu : Monitor of 1st Form A Section, lives in Kabeer Street. He fails in 1st Form and is "automatically excluded from the group".
 Sankar: Swami's classmate in 1st Form A Section. His father gets transferred at the end of the term. He is the most brilliant boy of the class.
 Samuel ("The Pea"):  Swami's classmate in 1st Form A Section. He is known as "The Pea" because of his height.

Swami's house 
 W. T. Srinivasan: Swami's father, a lawyer
 Lakshmi: Swami's mother, homemaker
 Swami's grandmother 
 Swami's late grandfather (sub-magistrate)
 Subbu: Swami's younger brother

Others 

 Rajam's father - A Deputy Police Superintendent 
 Rajam's mother
 The Headmaster of Albert Mission School 
 Mr. Ebenezer - A teacher at Albert Mission School, a Christian Ideologist
 The Head master of the Board School
 Dr. Kesavan - A physician in the Board School   
 Mr. Nair - An officer at District Forest Office
 Ranga - A cart man
 Sir. Peter - a famous footballer

Cricketers mentioned 
 Jack Hobbs
 Donald Bradman
 Duleep
 Maurice Tate

Cultural depictions 
 Swami and Friends was adapted by actor-director Shankar Nag into the television drama series Malgudi Days in 1986. The series was directed by Nag and Carnatic musician L. Vaidyanathan composed the score. R. K. Narayan's brother and acclaimed cartoonist R. K. Laxman was the sketch artist.

Critical reception

On 5 November 2019 BBC News listed Swami and Friends on its list of the 100 most influential novels.

References

External links 
 Swami and Friends by RK Narayan - The Guardian review (2011)

1935 novels
Novels by R. K. Narayan
Novels set in India
Indian English-language novels
Hamish Hamilton books
Novels set in British India
1935 debut novels